Lyttelton is a surname. Notable people with the surname include:

 The Lyttelton family, a British aristocratic family:
 Alfred Lyttelton, British politician and sportsman
 Arthur Lyttelton, Anglican Bishop
 Charles Lyttelton (1714–1768), English churchman and antiquary who served as Bishop of Carlisle 1762–1768 and President of the Society of Antiquaries of London 1765–1768
 Charles Lyttelton, 8th Viscount Cobham, British politician and cricketer
 Charles Lyttelton, 10th Viscount Cobham, ninth Governor-General of New Zealand and British cricketer
 Edward Lyttelton, British sportsman, Schoolmaster and Cleric
 George Lyttelton, 1st Baron Lyttelton, British politician
 George Lyttelton, 2nd Baron Lyttelton, British politician
 George William Lyttelton, 4th Baron Lyttelton, British politician and founder of Canterbury, New Zealand
 George William Lyttelton, British teacher and writer
 George William Spencer Lyttelton, British civil servant
 Humphrey Lyttelton, British jazz musician
 John Lyttelton, 9th Viscount Cobham (1881–1949), British politician
 John Lyttelton (MP) (died 1601), English politician
 John Lyttelton, 11th Viscount Cobham (1943–2006), British nobleman
 Sir John Lyttelton (1520–1590), constable of Dudley Castle, England, keeper of parks, Custos Rotulorum of Worcestershire
 Oliver Lyttelton, 1st Viscount Chandos, British businessman and politician
 Neville Lyttelton, British Army General
 Thomas de Littleton, British judge
 Thomas Lyttelton, 2nd Baron Lyttelton (1744–1779), British politician
 Sarah Lyttelton, Baroness Lyttelton, governess to Edward VII of the United Kingdom and wife of William Lyttelton, 3rd Baron Lyttelton 
 William Henry Lyttelton, 1st Baron Lyttelton, British colonial governor
 William Henry Lyttelton, 3rd Baron Lyttelton, British politician